Tjabel Boonstra (4 June 1899 – 18 May 1968) was a Dutch cyclist. He competed in two events at the 1920 Summer Olympics.

See also
 List of Dutch Olympic cyclists

References

External links
 

1899 births
1968 deaths
Dutch male cyclists
Olympic cyclists of the Netherlands
Cyclists at the 1920 Summer Olympics
People from Assen
Cyclists from Drenthe
20th-century Dutch people